Spilarctia aurocostata is a moth in the family Erebidae. It was described by Charles Oberthür in 1911. It is found in China in Sichuan, Yunnan, Shaanxi and eastern Tibet.

References

Moths described in 1911
aurocostata